Charles Alexander may refer to:

Born before 1900
 Charles Alexander, Duke of Württemberg (1684–1737), governor of Kingdom of Serbia, 1720–1733
 Charles Alexander, Grand Duke of Saxe-Weimar-Eisenach (1818–1901), ruler of Saxe-Weimar-Eisenach, 1853–1901
 Charles Alexander, Margrave of Brandenburg-Ansbach (1736–1806)
 Charles Alexander (politician) (1816–1905), merchant and politician in Quebec
 Charles Alexander (cricketer, born 1839) (1839–1917), Indian-born English cricketer
 Charles Alexander (cricketer, born 1847) (1847–1902), English cricketer and barrister
 Charles D. Alexander (1897–1962), American children's writer of short stories and novels
 Charles McCallon Alexander (1867–1920), gospel singer
 Charles Paul Alexander (1889–1981), American entomologist
 Prince Charles Alexander of Lorraine (1712–1780), Austrian military commander
 Charlie Alexander (1890–1970), pianist

Born after 1900
 Charles Alexander (defensive tackle) (born 1985), American football player
 Charles Alexander (running back) (born 1957), former professional American football player
 Charles Alexander (poet and book artist) (born 1957), American poet, publisher and book artist

See also